Charles Naveko (born 31 August 1966) is a Malawian long-distance runner. He competed in the men's 10,000 metres at the 1988 Summer Olympics.

References

1966 births
Living people
Athletes (track and field) at the 1988 Summer Olympics
Malawian male long-distance runners
Olympic athletes of Malawi
Place of birth missing (living people)